The Cover Up is the  third album from synthpop band I Am the World Trade Center, released in 2004. It is the first album released after the closure of the band's record label, Kindercore, which was co-founded by Dan Geller. It is also the first album released by Geller and Amy Dykes after their romantic break-up.

The album contains a cover of The Jam's "Going Underground." It was co-produced and mixed by electronic dance music pioneer and Mephisto Odyssey founder Mikael Johnston.

Track listing 
 "No Expectations" – 2:46
 "Great Escape" – 3:15
 "Future Sightings" – 3:14
 "Love Tragedy" – 2:59
 "Follow Me" – 2:26
 "Deny It" – 2:44
 "Going Underground" – 3:11
 "Different Stories" – 2:58
 "His 'N' Hers" – 2:51
 "The Cover Up" – 3:40
 "Silent Film Stars" – 3:56
 "Rock It" – 2:48

References 

2004 albums